KCCY may refer to:

 KCCY-FM, a radio station (96.9 FM) licensed to serve Pueblo, Colorado, United States
 KUBE (AM), a radio station (1350 AM) licensed to serve Pueblo, Colorado, which held the call sign KCCY from 2012 to 2018
 Northeast Iowa Regional Airport (ICAO code KCCY)